Ber Zalkind (1878-1944) was a Lithuanian Jewish painter. He studied in Paris, France and was a member of the Artists' Association of Vilna from 1909.

References

External links

1878 births
1944 deaths
20th-century Lithuanian painters
Painters from the Russian Empire